Louis van Biljon (31 July 1927 – 3 September 1995) was a South African sprinter. He competed in the men's 400 metres at the 1952 Summer Olympics.

References

1927 births
1995 deaths
Athletes (track and field) at the 1952 Summer Olympics
South African male sprinters
Olympic athletes of South Africa
People from Sakhisizwe Local Municipality